The Ministry of Justice (Republic of Palau) is part of the Executive Branch and consists of the following bureaus: 

 Office of the Attorney General
 Bureau of Immigration
 Bureau of Public Safety
 Division of Criminal Investigation/Drug Enforcement
 Division of Patrol
 Division of Fire & Rescue
 Division of Corrections
 Division of Marine Law Enforcement
 Division of Fish & Wildlife Protection

List of Ministers of Justice (Republic of Palau) 

 Thomas Remengesau Sr. (1981-1989) [1st Minister of Justice]
 Kuniwo Nakamura (1989-1993)
 Salvador Ingereklii (1993-2001)
 Michael J. Rosenthal (2001-2004)
 Elias Camsek Chin (2004-2008)
 John C. Gibbons (2009-2013)
 Antonio Bells (2013-2017)
 Raynold Oilouch (2017-present)

References 

Justice ministries
Government of Palau
Vice presidents of Palau